Uchikawa (written: 内川) is a Japanese surname. Notable people with the surname include:

, Japanese voice actress
, Japanese baseball player
, Japanese long-distance runner

See also
11593 Uchikawa, a main-belt asteroid, named for Uchikawa Yoshihisa (b. 1947), a noted amateur astronomer.
Uchikawa Dam, a dam in Ishikawa Prefecture, Japan

Japanese-language surnames